The Ordinance of Villers-Cotterêts is an extensive piece of reform legislation signed into law by Francis I of France on August 10, 1539, in the city of Villers-Cotterêts and the oldest French legislation still used partly by French courts.

Largely the work of Chancellor Guillaume Poyet, the legislative edict had 192 articles and dealt with a number of government, judicial and ecclesiastical matters.

Articles 110 and 111
Articles 110 and 111, the most famous, and the oldest still in use in the French legislation, called for the use of French in all legal acts, notarized contracts and official legislation to avoid any linguistic confusion:

The major goal of these articles was to discontinue the use of Latin in official documents (although Latin continued to be used in church registers in some regions of France), but they also had an effect on the use of the other languages and dialects spoken in many regions of France.

Registrations of births and deaths
The ordinance was part of a wider legislation regarding the policing of church benefices, to keep vital records registers in the various church local institutions (mainly parishes). The ordinance ordered the creation of at least a register of baptisms, needed for determining the age of candidates for ecclesiastical office, as a proof of one's date of birth, and a register of burials of churchmen, as a proof of one's date of death. Though both registers were kept by religious authorities, they were authenticated by a public notary, always a layman, and were kept in the local royal administration's archives. In fact, as the church kept parish registers since the Middle Ages (the oldest one in France is Giry's, of 1303), these registers were used to meet the ordinance's dispositions.

The national registration was fully laicized in 1792 during the French Revolution by order of the French Republic. These records have continued until the present and are kept at the departmental archives. The civil registration now includes birth, marriage, divorce, and death records.

Other articles
Another article prohibited guilds and trade federations in an attempt to suppress workers' strikes (although mutual-aid groups were unaffected).

Effects
Many of these clauses marked a move towards an expanded, unified and centralized state and the clauses on the use of French marked a major step towards the linguistic and ideological unification of France at a time of growing national sentiment and identity.

Despite the effort to bring clarity to the complex systems of justice and administration prevailing in different parts of France and to make them more accessible, Article 111 left uncertainty in failing to define the French mother tongue. Many varieties of French were spoken around the country, to say nothing of sizeable regional minorities like Bretons and Basques whose mother tongue was not French at all.

It was not until 1794 that the government decreed French to be the only language of the state for all official business, a situation still in force under Article 2 of the current French Constitution.

See also 

 Pleading in English Act 1362, English law mandating use of English instead of French in oral argument in court
 Proceedings in Courts of Justice Act 1730, British law mandating use of English instead of Latin in court writing

Gallery

References

Francophonie
Language policy in France
Laws and ordinances of the Ancien Régime
1539 in France
1539 in law
Francis I of France